The Baltoro Muztagh is a subrange of the Karakoram mountain range, in Baltistan region of the Gilgit-Baltistan, northernmost political entity of Pakistan; and in Xinjiang, China. The crest of the range forms part of the Pakistan-China border.

They are located on the north and east sides of the Baltoro Glacier.

Selected peaks of the Baltoro Muztagh
(This is a common criterion for peaks of this stature to be independent.)

Lower summits
There are a number of lower summits near the tongue of the Baltoro Glacier which are striking rock towers, and are famous for their aesthetic, difficult climbing. These include:

 Great Trango, 6,286 m
 Trango (Nameless) Tower, 6,239 m
 Uli Biaho Tower, 6,109 m

See also

 List of highest mountains
 List of mountains in Pakistan

Sources
Jerzy Wala, Orographical Sketch Map of the Karakoram, Swiss Foundation for Alpine Research, Zurich, 1990.

External links
 Northern Pakistan detailed placemarks in Google Earth

Mountain ranges of the Karakoram
Mountain ranges of Gilgit-Baltistan
Mountain ranges of Xinjiang